The Corrientes River is a river in Ecuador and Peru.

References

Rivers of Ecuador
Rivers of Peru
Rivers of Loreto Region
International rivers of South America